Nicolas Mohr (born 1 May 1996) is an Austrian footballer who currently plays as a goalkeeper for Austrian Regionalliga club FC Lauterach.

External links

1996 births
Living people
Austrian footballers
FC Lustenau players
SC Austria Lustenau players
2. Liga (Austria) players
Association football goalkeepers